Militant Christianity may refer to:

 Christian fundamentalism, a Christian movement often described as having militant attitude
 the Church Militant, Christians who struggle as 'soldiers of Christ'
 the crusader movement, a militant Christian movement inspired by the First Crusade

See also